Evgenia Sergeevna Didula (born January 23, 1987, Samara, Russia), better known by the stage name EVgenika, is a Russian pop, ethno-pop and folk singer.

Wife of the Russian guitarist and composer Valery Mikhailovich Didula.

Biography 

Evgeniya Didyulya was born on January 23, 1987, in Samara. At the age of two, she moved with her parents to Novotroitsk. Graduated from piano school. After graduating from the 9th grade of the gymnasium, she entered the Orenburg State College of Arts named after Rostropovich. Later, she moved to Moscow, where she entered the Russian Academy of Music. Gnesins on folk vocals, which she also graduated with honors.

In 2016, together with the DiDuLa project, the founder of which is her husband Valery Didula, she recorded an album entitled EVgenika. In the same year, she recorded the video "Мигалки", the director of which was a video maker under the pseudonym Bebeshka.

In 2017, a debut album entitled "Optimist" was released, which included 11 tracks. In the same year, Evgenia released a video clip for the song «Штаны на вырост», which premiered on December 5. Later, she released a video for the songs "Бабы", "Чувствовало сердце", "После меня" and "Не любовь". In 2019, a book was written entitled "Как быть успешной мамой: воспитание детей, карьера, творчество и счастливая семья.»

In 2020, she took part in the All-Russian vocal competition «Новая звезда-2020». She is a laureate of international and national competitions and festivals.

Discography

References

External links 
 Официальная страница Евгении Дидюли в социальной сети «ВКонтакте»
 

1987 births
Living people